Lakeside Academy Charter School was established in 1998 in Belle Glade, Florida, by Barbara Litinski. The Academy serves a predominantly underprivileged K-6 student population from the Glades area of Palm Beach County.

Schools in Florida
Charter schools in Florida